The eighth cycle of Australia's Next Top Model began airing 9 July 2013 on Fox8. Former host Sarah Murdoch left the show and was replaced by Jennifer Hawkins. Alex Perry and Charlotte Dawson returned as judges for this season with Didier Cohen joining the show as a new judge. This is the last series of Australia's Next Top Model to feature Dawson, before she died of an apparent suicide five months after it ended.

The prizes for this cycle included a one-year modelling contract with IMG Sydney and worldwide representation by IMG London, New York, Milan and Paris, as well as a 20,000 cash prize thanks to TRESemmé, a brand new Nissan Dualis, an overseas trip to Paris to meet with IMG Paris, and an eight-page editorial spread and the cover of Harper's Bazaar Australia.

The winner of the competition was 16-year-old Melissa Juratowitch from Melbourne, Victoria.

Series summary
Fifty semi-finalists were selected to take part in this years' competition. The first episode of the show was shown in a special screening for fans of the series. Fifteen official contestants were chosen to compete for the title.

Requirements
The all contestants had to be aged 16 or over in order to apply for the show. To qualify, all applicants had to be an Australian citizen currently living in Australia. Additional requirements stated that a contestant could not have had previous experience as a model in a national campaign within the last five years, and if a contestant was represented by an agent or a manager, she had to terminate that representation prior to the competition.

Auditions
Auditions for cycle 8 began to take place on 13 January in Adelaide, continuing in Perth, Brisbane, Townsville, and Sydney throughout the rest of the month before wrapping up in Melbourne on 23 January.

Cast

Contestants

(Ages stated are at start of contest)

Judges
Jennifer Hawkins (host)
Alex Perry
Charlotte Dawson
Didier Cohen

Episodes

Results

 The contestant was eliminated
 The contestant was disqualified
 The contestant was part of a non-elimination bottom two
  The contestant won the competition

Bottom two

 The contestant was eliminated after her first time in the bottom two/three
 The contestant was eliminated after her second time in the bottom two/three
 The contestant was disqualified from the competition
 The contestant was eliminated in the final judging and placed third
 The contestant was eliminated in the final judging and placed as the runner-up

Notes

Average call-out order
Final two is not included.

Controversy
Prior to the airing of the cycle, it was reported that a contestant had been disqualified from the competition for bullying. Host Jennifer Hawkins said of the incident, "I don’t know why but I went into (the show) thinking ‘oh, there won’t be drama, everything will be fine’, but of course there is always drama. A lot of things have happened in the house and we were dealing with something that hasn't happened before. It was really intense." Hawkins later specified that the cause for disqualification was not bullying, but violence among two of the contestants on the show. She also revealed that Foxtel and the show's production company Shine Australia requested for the girl to be ejected. The disqualified contestant was revealed to be Taylah Roberts from Perth, who physically attacked Ashley Pogmore. The day before the airing of the episode in which Roberts was disqualified, footage of Roberts choking Pogmore was shown on A Current Affair.

References

External links
 Official website (archive at the Wayback Machine)

2013 Australian television seasons
Australia's Next Top Model seasons
Television shows filmed in Australia
Television shows filmed in Thailand
Television shows filmed in Mauritius